New Tazewell is a city in Claiborne County, Tennessee, United States. The population was 3,037 at the 2010 census.The population was 2,769 at the 2020 census.

Geography
New Tazewell is located in central Claiborne County, adjacent to the twin city of Tazewell, at a coordinate of  (36.437838, -83.607613).

Demographics

2020 census

As of the 2020 United States census, there were 2,769 people, 1,293 households, and 731 families residing in the town.

2000 census
As of the census of 2000, there were 2,871 people, 1,200 households, and 753 families residing in the city. The population density was 542.2 people per square mile (209.2/km2). There were 1,414 housing units at an average density of 267.0 per square mile (103.0/km2). The racial makeup of the city was 96.20% White, 1.46% African American, 0.45% Native American, 0.42% Asian, 0.77% from other races, and 0.70% from two or more races. Hispanic or Latino of any race were 1.04% of the population. There were 1,200 households, out of which 29.4% had children under the age of 18 living with them, 43.8% were married couples living together, 14.6% had a female householder with no husband present, and 37.3% were non-families. 34.1% of all households were made up of individuals, and 14.7% had someone living alone who was 65 years of age or older. The average household size was 2.30 and the average family size was 2.97.

In the city, the population was spread out, with 24.1% under the age of 18, 8.7% from 18 to 24, 27.8% from 25 to 44, 23.3% from 45 to 64, and 16.1% who were 65 years of age or older. The median age was 37 years. For every 100 females, there were 84.6 males. For every 100 females age 18 and over, there were 82.5 males.

The median income for a household in the city was $21,875, and the median income for a family was $31,458. Males had a median income of $22,181 versus $18,472 for females. The per capita income for the city was $13,619. About 24.2% of families and 29.4% of the population were below the poverty line, including 40.1% of those under age 18 and 32.1% of those age 65 or over.

History
When the railroad line was built from Knoxville through Cumberland Gap in the late 1880s, it bypassed the city of Tazewell. It is uncertain whether the railroad was unable to obtain right of way, or whether the decision was made because of topography, but the railroad depot was built about two miles to the west of Tazewell. A new community sprang up around the depot, called Cowan City on old survey maps. The city was incorporated as New Tazewell in the 1920s, but the charter was voted down about fifteen years later. It was reincorporated in 1954.

The city of New Tazewell was soon a thriving commercial location. Entrepreneur John L. Buis built a two-story brick building across from the train depot where he opened the Cherokee Hotel. The building also housed the first post office and a general store, and was served by a livery stable just down the street. Buis also bought farms in the area and opened a cannery in Tazewell where he produced canned goods to ship north by railroad. Burley tobacco production in the area provided a cash crop, and warehouses were built in the town for tobacco auctions in the late fall and early winter. Tobacco buyers came in by train and stayed at the hotel, with easy access to the warehouses by walking or by horse and buggy from the livery stable.

As burley tobacco production declined in the United States, the warehouses were abandoned, and the city's economy shifted from farming to manufacturing. Today, the rail-line carries freight from New Tazewell, consisting mostly of timber.

Government

Board of Mayor and Aldermen
New Tazewell uses the mayor-board-of-aldermen system, which was established in 1954 when the city was incorporated. It is composed of the mayor, and six aldermen. The citizens elect the mayor and four aldermen to four-year terms. The board elects a vice mayor from among the six aldermen.

State government
New Tazewell is represented in the 35th District of the Tennessee House of Representatives by Jerry Sexton, a Republican.

It is represented in the 8th District of the Tennessee Senate by Frank Niceley, also a Republican.

Education
New Tazewell is home to a satellite campus of Walters State Community College.

Economy
New Tazewell is a hub for several manufacturers, including furniture manufacturer England Furniture Incorporated now a division of La-Z-Boy, DeRoyal Industries, Bushline Furniture, King Business Forms, Giles Industries, Homesteader Cargo Trailers, Volunteer Knit Apparel, Inc. and others.

References

 An East Tennessee Pioneer Heritage Site including historical information on Claiborne County and New Tazewell, Tennessee

Cities in Claiborne County, Tennessee
Cities in Tennessee
1954 establishments in Tennessee